Josef Stalder (6 February 1919 – 2 March 1991) was a Swiss gymnast and Olympic champion.

Career
He competed at the 1948 Summer Olympics in London, where he received a gold medal on the horizontal bar, a silver medal in team combined exercises, and a bronze medal on the parallel bars. He also won four medals at the 1952 Summer Olympics in Helsinki.

He was the originator and namesake of stalder circles, now a common skill on both the horizontal bar and the uneven bars.

References

1919 births
1991 deaths
Swiss male artistic gymnasts
Gymnasts at the 1948 Summer Olympics
Gymnasts at the 1952 Summer Olympics
Olympic gymnasts of Switzerland
Olympic gold medalists for Switzerland
Originators of elements in artistic gymnastics
Olympic medalists in gymnastics
Medalists at the 1952 Summer Olympics
Medalists at the 1948 Summer Olympics
Olympic silver medalists for Switzerland
Olympic bronze medalists for Switzerland
20th-century Swiss people